Belebey (Bäläbäy) is a town in the Republic of Bashkortostan, Russia, located on the bank of the Usen River,  from Ufa. Population:

History
Belebey was established in 1715 and granted town status in 1781. Between 1865 and 1919 it was part of Ufa Governorate.

Administrative and municipal status
Within the framework of administrative divisions, Belebey serves as the administrative center of Belebeyevsky District, even though it is not a part of it. As an administrative division, it is incorporated separately as the town of republic significance of Belebey—an administrative unit with the status equal to that of the districts. As a municipal division, the town of republic significance of Belebey is incorporated within Belebeyevsky Municipal District as Belebey Urban Settlement.

Demographics
Ethnic composition:
Russians: 46.9%
Tatars: 23.6%
Chuvash people: 12%
Bashkirs: 11%

Climate

References

Notes

Sources

External links
Official website of Belebey 
Directory of organizations in Belebey 

Cities and towns in Bashkortostan
Belebeyevsky Uyezd
Monotowns in Russia